The Comox Air Force Museum collects, preserves, interprets and exhibits artifacts relating to CFB Comox, its squadrons and its units. The museum is located at the main gate of CFB Comox, located in the Comox Valley on Vancouver Island, British Columbia. The museum opened its doors in the current location 12 September 1987. In addition to the exhibits, the museum has an aviation reference library and an aviation art gallery.  The Heritage Air Park where the aircraft are on display is located 500 metres down the road from the museum as is the Y2K Spitfire restoration hangar.

Aircraft
The following aircraft are on display in the Comox Air Force Museum's Heritage Air Park located 500 meters from the Museum:
CF-100 Canuck
CF-101 Voodoo
CF-104 Starfighter
CP-107 Argus
CP-121 Tracker
CT-114 Tutor (has been moved to the Comox Valley Visitor Centre just off Inland Hwy)
CT-133 Silver Star
De Havilland Vampire
Douglas Dakota
Piasecki H-21

Exhibits

First World War
This exhibit displays artifacts from the First World War focusing on airman from the West Coast.

Second World War
This exhibit has many artifacts from the Second World War some of which include:

A Fire balloon many of which were launched by the Japanese in hopes of setting the West Coast of North America on fire.
 John Colwell's Stalag Luft III POW Log Book.
 James Francis Edwards
 Douglas "Duke" Warren

UN Peacekeeping
This exhibit displays many artifacts from Canada's part in UN Peacekeeping missions.

NORAD

19 Wing's Squadrons
Past Squadrons Exhibit: This exhibit displays artefacts from squadrons that served at Comox, but have since moved or been disbanded.
409 Squadron
 Orenda 11 turbojet engine
 AIR-2 Genie Missile load training device
 CF-101 Voodoo ejection seat
414 Squadron
 The Black Knight Suit of Armour
 VU 33 Squadron
 Tracker Tail Hook
 Present Squadrons Exhibit: This exhibit displays artifacts from squadrons currently serving at Comox.
 442 Squadron
 Search and Rescue Technician Jump Suit
 407 Squadron
 Wright 3350 Cyclone 18 Piston Engine
 Torpedo
 Sonobuoy

Vehicles
Willys Jeep

See also

Organization of Military Museums of Canada
Military history of Canada

Affiliations
The Museum is affiliated with: CMA,  CHIN, OMMC and Virtual Museum of Canada.

References

External links 
 Museum website
 Y2K Spitfire Restoration Website
 19 Wing Comox Website
 History of the Canadian Air Force
 History of the Canadian Forces Museums 1919-2004

Military and war museums in Canada
Aviation history of Canada
Aerospace museums in British Columbia
Comox Valley Regional District